Ahmed Hajeri (born November 16, 1948) is a Tunisian painter.

He was born in Tazerka and emigrated to France in 1968  where he met Roland Morand an architect and painter.
In 1977, he presented a display at the Galerie Messine de Paris. In 1985 he showcased at the Medina Gallery in Tunis and at the Phyllis Kind Gallery in New York City. He was also responsible for artwork during the 1988 Summer Olympic Games in Seoul.

Exhibitions
 Main Personal Exhibitions
1978 - Galerie Messine, Paris
1982 - Galerie Messine, Paris
1985 - Galerie Médina, Tunis
1986 - Phyllis Kind Gallery, New York
1992 - Musée de Sidi Bou Saïd, Sidi Bou Saïd
1995 - Institut du monde arabe, Paris
1997 - Galerie Fanny Guillon-Lafaille, Paris
1998 - Biennale d'art contemporain, Dakar
1999 - Centre d'art contemporain, Brussels
2004 - Galerie Danièle Besseiche, Paris
2006 - Kanvas Art Gallery, La Soukra, Tunis
2008 - Kanvas Art Gallery, La Soukra, Tunis
 Main group exhibitions
1988 - Olympiades des arts, Seoul
1992 - Exposition universelle, Séville
1999 - Centre Wallonie, Bruxelles
2002 - Institut du monde arabe, Paris
2018 - Galerie Kalysté la Soukra
2022 - Galerie Kalysté la Soukra

Awards 
1986 - Grand prix national de la peinture, Tunisie
1998 - Chevalier de l'ordre du mérite culturel, Tunisie
2000 - 3 prix de la ville de Tunis

Bibliography 
Ali Louati, Ahmed Hajeri, éd. Simpact, Tunis, 1997

External links 
 Official website of Ahmed Hajeri
 Gros & Delettrez

Tunisian emigrants to France
1948 births
Living people
20th-century French painters
20th-century French male artists
French male painters
20th-century Tunisian painters
21st-century French painters
21st-century French male artists